The Nash Statesman is a full-sized automobile that was built by Nash Motors for the 1950 through 1956 model years in two generations. The Statesman series was positioned between the top-line Nash Ambassador and above the Nash Rambler.

First generation (1950 and 1951) 

Nash developed its post–World War II automobiles using an advanced unit-body construction with fastback aerodynamic styling under the Airflyte name, reflecting a popular styling trend in the 1950s. The cars were available as a two- or four-door sedan. A distinguishing feature of all Nashes are the "skirted" fenders. The base Nash 600 was renamed Nash Statesman for the 1950 model year.

The wheelbase of the Statesman was  shorter than the companion Ambassador line. This was achieved by using a shorter front "clip" (the portion of a car from the cowl forward) than was installed on the Ambassador. Statesman and Ambassador hoods along with front fenders are not interchangeable. From the cowl rearward, the two series' dimensions were identical. Two-door models included Nash's exclusive "Airliner Reclining" front seat, which was optional on the four-door sedans. These seats could be converted to form a bed.

Statesman engine designs were based on the L-head Nash Light Six engine that was designed in the 1920s and continued into the 1940s in the Nash LaFayette and Nash 600. It is characterized by the lack of intake and exhaust manifolds. The Statesman models were comparatively lighter resulting in fuel efficiency as reported by owners and testers.

Nash Statesman models were offered in three trims, the top-line Statesman Custom and the entry-level Statesman Super as well as a base fleet-only model for commercial and institutional use.

The Statesman models, along with the Ambassador line, were the volume and profit leaders for Nash.

Second generation (1952 through 1956)

A new design was introduced for the 1952 model year featuring a large "envelope-bodied" sedan with enclosed wheels that were characteristic for Nash. The all-new notchback Statesman design coincided with Nash's 50th anniversary and included styling by Pininfarina, the Italian designer.

The 1954 models included the outside mounted "continental" spare tire increasing trunk space and making emergency tire changes easier.

The 1956 models received larger and slanted front parking lights, as well as larger tail lamps.

The final Nash Statesman models were built during August 1956. Starting in 1957 all full-size Nash models were Ambassadors.

Notes

References

External links

 Statesman at The Crittenden Automotive Library, including detailed pictures of a 1950 Statesman Super
 Nash Car Club
 

1950s cars
Cars introduced in 1949
Full-size vehicles
Statesman
Rear-wheel-drive vehicles
Sedans
Streamline Moderne cars